Emil William Henry (March 4, 1929 – January 31, 2022) was an American lawyer who served as chairman of the Federal Communications Commission from June 2, 1963, to May 1, 1966, as a Democrat.

References

FCC Chairman Happy, but 'Ages' in One Year
Political Graveyard
 https://archive.org/details/currentbiography1964thom/page/190/mode/2up
 https://archive.org/details/sim_television-radio-age_1963-04-01_10_18/page/n91/mode/1up

1929 births
2022 deaths
Politicians from Memphis, Tennessee:
Tennessee lawyers
Tennessee Democrats
Vanderbilt University Law School alumni
Chairmen of the Federal Communications Commission
Kennedy administration personnel
Lyndon B. Johnson administration personnel